Direct voice may be:
(in linguistics) Direct–inverse alignment
(in seances) Mediumship#Direct voice